The Lancaster House located at 407 Third St. in Stevensville, Montana is a vernacular "pyramidal cottage" built in 1909.  It was listed on the National Register of Historic Places in 1991.

It was deemed notable "as a fine example of early 20th century cast concrete block construction in Stevensville. Constructed by David L. Cannon, it illustrates the techniques and craftsmanship employed by one of the most productive local contractors of the 1900s-1910s, as the local economy boomed, and the town grew rapidly."  It has a truncated hipped roof.

References

Houses on the National Register of Historic Places in Montana
Houses completed in 1909
National Register of Historic Places in Ravalli County, Montana